As a nickname, Hook or the Hook may refer to:
 John Lee Hooker (1912–2001), American blues singer, songwriter and guitarist
 Hook Dillon (1924–2004), American basketball player
 Harry Aleman (1939–2010), Chicago mobster nicknamed "the Hook"
 Abu Hamza al-Masri (born 1958), former imam of Finsbury Park Mosque in London, England, known as "Hook" in the British tabloid press
 Anthony Griffin (rugby league) (born 1966), Penrith Panthers coach known by the nickname "Hook"
 Demetrius "Hook" Mitchell (born 1968), American former streetball player
 Hook (wrestler) (born 1999), ring name of professional wrestler Tyler Senerchia

See also 

 Hooks (nickname)

Lists of people by nickname